Ribeira Seca (Portuguese for "dry stream") is a civil parish in the municipality of Vila Franca do Campo on the island of São Miguel in the Portuguese archipelago of the Azores. The population in 2011 was 1,106, in an area of 5.53 km2.

History
In June 2002, the civil parish was divided from the neighbouring parish of São Miguel to form its own autonomous local authority.

References

Freguesias of Vila Franca do Campo (Azores)